Paramount Miami Worldcenter is a 60-story condominium tower in the Miami Worldcenter complex. The building contains 569 residential units, as well as an extensive amenities deck, containing an outdoor soccer field, two tennis courts, bungalows, gardens, a rooftop observatory, resort-style pools, walking paths, a game room, an indoor basketball court, a boxing studio, a golf simulator, 26 pool-side cabanas, and a "skyport", a landing area for flying cars.

History 
Ground was broken on the $500 million project in early March 2016, as part of the wider Miami Worldcenter development. The building was designed by architecture firm Elkus Manfredi in collaboration with interior design firm IDDI and landscape architect DS Boca. By December 13, 2017 the building had reached the halfway point, at which time the structure had been 70% sold to buyers of over 48 nationalities. The building was topped out, at 700 feet, in early August 2018, with the milestone celebrated with over 50 flags adorning the top of the structure, representing the nationalities of those who had bought units in the building. In late July 2019, the building received a temporary certificate of occupancy, for units up to the 38th floor, allowing occupants to make preparations and begin moving into the structure. At this time, the building was 90% sold, with buyers from 56 countries.

References

Residential skyscrapers in Miami
Residential condominiums in Miami
Residential buildings completed in 2019
2019 establishments in Florida